Green Valley, California may refer to:
 Green Valley, former name of Greenwood, El Dorado County, California
 Green Valley, El Dorado County, California, former settlement
 Green Valley, Los Angeles County, California, census-designated place
 Green Valley, Solano County, California, census-designated place
 Solano County Green Valley AVA
Green Valley Lake, California